Suchodaniec  (German: Sucho-Danietz, from 1934 Trockenfeld) is a village in the administrative district of Gmina Izbicko, within Strzelce County, Opole Voivodeship, in south-western Poland.

References

Suchodaniec